Athenkosi Mayinje (born 18 January 1996) is a South African professional rugby union player for the Griffons (rugby union) in the Currie Cup and in the Rugby Challenge. He usually plays as an outside back .

Rugby career

Youth rugby

Mayinje earned provincial colours as early as primary school level, when he was selected to represent Eastern Province at the 2009 Under-13 Craven Week tournament held in Kimberley. He started as a winger in their opening match of the tournament against the Lions, before moving to flanker for their remaining matches against KwaZulu-Natal, the Blue Bulls and Western Province. He helped Eastern Province to victories in all four of their matches, including the unofficial final of the tournament against Western Province.

In 2014, he again represented Eastern Province at the Craven Week, this time at the Under-18 tournament for high school pupils, in a tournament held in Middelburg. He was used as a right winger in this competition and scored a try in their opening match of the tournament against the Blue Bulls in a 26–25 victory, another one in their 19–5 victory over the Free State in their second match and a third in their match against SWD, a 25–7 win for Eastern Province in the main match of the final day as they were crowned unofficial champions for the tournament. His three tries were the most by an Eastern Province player during the competition. two behind the top try scorers in the tournament. After the conclusion of the Craven Week tournament, Mayinje was also included in the  squad for the 2014 Under-19 Provincial Championship, the first season that the team competed in Group A of the competition, having won promotion from Group B in 2013.

He again represented the Under-19 team during the 2015 Under-19 Provincial Championship Group A, their second season at that level. Eastern Province U19 won eleven of their twelve matches to top the log to qualify for a home semi-final. His six tries was the joint-second most by an Eastern Province player behind Junior Pokomela and joint-ninth overall in Group A of the competition.

Eastern Province Kings

In his fourth appearance – away to Namibian side  in Windhoek – Mayinje scored his first points in first class rugby when he converted centre Somila Jho's 34th minute try. After missing a 52nd-minute penalty attempt, Mayinje scored his first try in first class rugby, getting the last of the EP Kings' five tries in the match. He also converted his own try, helping his side to a 31–18 victory, their first win in the competition.

References

South African rugby union players
Living people
1996 births
Rugby union players from Port Elizabeth
Rugby union wings
Eastern Province Elephants players
Griffons (rugby union) players